Lukas Runggaldier (born July 31, 1987 in Bolzano) is a retired Italian Nordic combined skier who has competed between 2005 and 2020. At the 2010 Winter Olympics, he finished tenth in the 4 x 5 km team event, 11th in the 10 km individual large hill, and 16th in the 10 km individual normal hill event.

Biography
At the FIS Nordic World Ski Championships 2011 in Oslo, Runggaldier finished 10th in the 10 km individual normal hill and 8th in the individual large hill. His best World Cup finish was 4th, first in a 10 km individual normal hill event at Seefeld (Austria) in January 2011, and in another 10 km race in Chaux-Neuve (France) one year later. In Sochi he finished 7th in the  Gunderson individual normal hill.

Further notable results
 2008: 1st, Italian championships of Nordic combined skiing
 2010: 2nd, Italian championships of Nordic combined skiing, sprint

Runggaldier speaks Italian, Ladin, German, and English.

References

External links 

1987 births
Ladin people
Living people
Italian male Nordic combined skiers
Nordic combined skiers at the 2010 Winter Olympics
Nordic combined skiers at the 2014 Winter Olympics
Nordic combined skiers at the 2018 Winter Olympics
Olympic Nordic combined skiers of Italy
Sportspeople from Bolzano